Howard Thomas Platt (born June 5, 1938) is an American stage and television actor, singer and director, best known for his role as "Officer Hopkins" on the TV series Sanford and Son (1972–76). Platt wrote and performed “Riverwinds” for LaSalle: Expedition II in 1977.

Career biography

Platt has made numerous comedic and dramatic appearances on television, most recently as Rev. Weber in What About Joan? Along with his role as Hoppy on Sanford And Son, Platt has also had guest roles as Dr. Phil Newman on The Bob Newhart Show (in a total of 6 episodes), Max on Alice, Major Ted Spector on M*A*S*H, and Judge Jonathan Stockfish on Evening Shade. He portrayed 5 different characters on Barney Miller.

As a series regular he played Captain Doug March on the CBS-TV sitcom Flying High (1978–79). His many movie roles include T.R. Baskin, Nixon, The Cat from Outer Space, and Norma Jean & Marilyn.

Directorial credits
As a director, Platt has directed a dozen shows including A Couple of Blaguards, Don't Dress For Dinner, Pump Boys and Dinettes, Love Letters and Steel Magnolias.

Filmography

Film

Television

External links

1938 births
American male film actors
American male stage actors
American male television actors
Male actors from Chicago
Living people